Lazarus Tembo was one of Zambia's most popular singers. He was born in the Eastern Province of Zambia, went blind at the age of eight, and eventually, under President Kaunda, became Zambia's Junior Minister of Culture.

A Zambian folk music award was named after him. He also supported the work of the Lusaka Nutrition Group, an organisation which was a precursor to the work of Makeni Ecumenical Centre, before 1971.

Selected Songs

Mtandezeni
Baby Feeding Song   
Ulwimbo Lwakulisho Mwana   
Nyimbo Ya Podwetsa Mwana  
Malambo
Jeni
Kola
Chitukuko Na Mowa
Ukwati Ndi M'tima
Ndayenda yenda
Umukolwe kokoliko
Gozha Ng'ombe
Njala
Wokondedwa
Kaleya

References

20th-century Zambian male singers
Blind musicians
People from Eastern Province, Zambia